Flux of Pink Indians was an English punk rock band from Bishop's Stortford, Hertfordshire, England, active between 1980 and 1986.

Biography

The band formed in Hertfordshire, England in 1980 from the remaining members of The Epileptics (who during the first half of 1979 changed their name to Epi-X, owing to letters of complaint from The British Epilepsy Association) by Colsk Latter (vocals) and Derek Birkett (bass guitar) with guitarists Andy Smith, Neil Puncher, and drummer Sid Ation (who was also a member of Rubella Ballet).

The group signed with the Crass Records label in 1981. Their debut EP Neu Smell was released on Crass in 1981; it featured indie hit "Tube Disaster". Flux of Pink Indians continued in 1982 with the album Strive to Survive Causing Least Suffering Possible released on their own label, Spiderleg.

They released a second album in 1983, The Fucking Cunts Treat Us Like Pricks; this was banned by many British retailers, and copies were seized by Greater Manchester Police from the Eastern Bloc record shop, which was charged with displaying "Obscene Articles For Publication For Gain".

Ation left the group to work full-time with his other band Rubella Ballet, and was soon replaced by Bambi, formerly of Discharge, while Smith was replaced by Simon Middlehurst. However, both departed quickly for their original band, The Insane. While auditioning for their replacements, Puncher also left; the line-up was completed by former Darlex and Epileptics guitarist Kev Hunter, and drummer Martin Wilson. An extensive interview with the band appeared in No Class fanzine.

By 1986, the band had shortened their name to Flux; in that year they released their third album, Uncarved Block, which was produced by Adrian Sherwood and featured several members of the On-U Sound Records label.

Flux disbanded in 1987.

Birkett, making use of his experiences with Spiderleg, set up One Little Indian Records. Latter went on to form the dance-influenced Hotalacio, and was joined by drummer Wilson and guitarist Middlehurst.

In 2007, the band re-formed for an intended one-off gig supporting ex-Crass vocalist Steve Ignorant for his "The Feeding of the 5000" gig at London's Shepherd's Bush Empire in November of that year. The Strive To Survive-era line-up (Latter, Hunter and Wilson) was joined by ex-Decadence Within bass player Ian Glasper, replacing Birkett, and as a result of their well-received set the band played another three gigs in 2008, in Bradford, Dijon and London.

The band and their album Uncarved Block were mentioned in the 2013 book Taoism for Dummies, under the sidebar titled "An uncarved Flux of Pink anarchy".

Members

Original lineup
Colsk Latter (vocals)
Derek Birkett (bass guitar)
Andy Smith (guitar)
Neil Puncher (guitar)
Sid Ation (drums)

Later members
Dave "Bambi" Ellesmere (drums)
Simon Middlehurst (guitar)
Kev Hunter (guitar)
Martin Wilson (drums)
Louise Bell (guitar)
Tim Kelly (guitar)

Discography
(chart placings shown are from the UK independent chart unless stated otherwise)

Flux of Pink Indians

LPs
 Strive to Survive Causing the Least Suffering Possible (1983, Spiderleg Records, LP, SDL8) No. 1 (UK Albums Chart No. 79) (reissued 1987 on One Little Indian)
 The Fucking Cunts Treat Us Like Pricks (1984, Spiderleg Records) No. 2 (reissued 1987 on One Little Indian)
 Uncarved Block (1986, as Flux – One Little Indian Records) No. 16

Singles and EPs
 Neu Smell (1981, Crass Records, 7", No. 2 – Re-released in 1987 credited to 'Flux', One Little Indian, 12", No. 30)
"Taking a Liberty" (7" – Spiderleg Records – 1984)

Compilations
Neu Smell / Taking a Liberty EP (12" – One Little Indian – 1987)
Strive To Survive & Neu Smell (LP – One Little Indian – 1989)
The Fucking Cunts Treat Us Like Pricks / Taking A Liberty (LP – One Little Indian – 1989)
Not So Brave (LP – Overground Records – 1997)
Live Statement (LP – Overground Records – 2002)
Fits and Starts (CD – Dr. Strange Records – 2003)

The Licks
 1970's E.P. (1979, Stortbeat Records, 7", BEAT8)
Tracks: "1970s Have Been Made In Hong Kong" / "System Rejects" / "Hitler's Still A Nazi" / "War Crimes"

The Epileptics
 Last Bus To Debden EP (1981, Spiderleg, 7", SDL2) No. 17
 1970's E.P. (1982, Spiderleg, 7", SDL1) (re-recording of The Licks EP with Penny Rimbaud of Crass on drums) No. 21

See also
Animal rights and punk subculture

References

External links
Flux of Pink Indians on Myspace
[ Flux of Pink Indians] at Allmusic

Anarcho-punk groups
English punk rock groups
English post-punk music groups
One Little Independent Records artists
Musical groups established in 1980
Musical groups disestablished in 1986
Let Them Eat Vinyl artists